Dariusz Michał Seliga (born 10 April 1969 in Skierniewice) is a Polish politician. He was elected to the Sejm on 25 September 2005, getting 5251 votes in 10 Piotrków Trybunalski district as a candidate from the Law and Justice list.

See also
Members of Polish Sejm 2005-2007

External links
Dariusz Seliga - parliamentary page - includes declarations of interest, voting record, and transcripts of speeches.

1969 births
Living people
People from Skierniewice
Members of the Polish Sejm 2005–2007
Law and Justice politicians
Members of the Polish Sejm 2007–2011
Members of the Polish Sejm 2011–2015